Heliosia atriplaga is a moth of the family Erebidae. It was described by George Hampson in 1914. It is found on the Loyalty Islands in the south-west Pacific.

References

 

Nudariina
Moths described in 1914